FC Concordia Basel is a Swiss football club based in Basel. The club was founded in 1907. They play in the 2nd regional league which is the fifth level, and their home stadium was Rankhof Stadium until the 2008-09 season. FC Concordia Basel has links to FC Basel. FC Concordia Basel has recently won clashes with some major clubs such as FC Basel and YoungBoys.

They won the Och Cup (considered as the former Swiss Cup) in 1922. It is the club's only title.

History

In September 2008, Concordia Basel became the first football club in Western Europe to sign North Korean players when they signed North Korea internationals Pak Chol-Ryong and Kim Kuk-Jin.

Former players

References

External links
Official website 

 
Football clubs in Switzerland
Association football clubs established in 1907
Sport in Basel
1907 establishments in Switzerland